Maharaja Trophy T20 ,  formerly known as Karnataka Premier league , is an Indian Twenty20 cricket league established by the Karnataka State Cricket Association (KSCA) in August 2009 and modelled after the Indian Premier League (IPL).  As of 2022, there are 6 teams competing in the league.

The Karnataka Premier League (KPL), as it was known then, will now be called the Maharaja Trophy T20. The rebranding aside, the Karnataka State Cricket Association (KSCA) has made some structural changes in the way the six-team tournament will be run going forward.

Auction 
The winning bidders of the eight franchisee teams were announced at the conclusion of the auction, held on 14 August 2009. The auction earned the KSCA , which received bids from 22 potential sponsors.

Teams

Defunct teams

Team performances by season

Season 1 (2009/10) 
The Karnataka Premier League finals were held on 23 September 2009 as a 20-over match between Provident Bangalore and the Belagavi Panthers, played at M Chinnaswamy Stadium, Bengaluru. Provident Bangalore won by five wickets (with four balls remaining). The Player of the Match was Amit Verma for (Rural). The Player of the Series was J. Arunkumar of the Belagavi Panthers. The Belgavi Panthers have in their ranks experienced players like captain J. Arunkumar, Manish Pandey and R. Vinay Kumar. J. Arunkumar scored the most runs (326) in the first year of Mantri KPL while Manish Pandey holds the record for the highest scorer (112 not out), David Johnson was the highest wicket taker with 17 scalps after a 6-7 year return to cricket and Vinay Kumar was the second highest wicket taker (14 wickets).

Teams and standings 

Full table on cricinfo
<div style="font-size:95%">(C) = Champions; (R) = Runner-up.

Season 2 (2010/11) 
The season 2 of KPL was held from 18 September 2010 to 3 October 2010 in Mysuru. Mangalore United won season 2 of KPL.

Teams and standings 

Full table on cricinfo
<div style="font-size:95%">(C) = Eventual Champion; (R) = Runner-up.

Season 3 (2014/15) 
The third season was held from 28 August 2014 to 12 September 2014 and the auction for the same was conducted on 7 August. The 7-team Twenty20 tournament went until 12 September.

Full table on cricinfo

Season 4 (2015/16) 
The fourth season saw a new team making a debut, Namma Shivamogga, adding up to 8 teams overall. The season went from 2 to 19 September at Hubballi and Mysuru.

Full table on cricinfo

Season 5 (2016/17) 

Full table on cricinfo

Season 6 (2017/18) 
The sixth season saw a remarkable fan engagement via social media reaching almost 1.5 crores. The Social Media engagement was boosted by a company called Popupster  using different community management skills and technologies including the use of the 360-degree camera (First time in India). 

Full table on cricinfo

Season 7 (2018/19) 

Full table on cricinfo

KPL Winners

References

External links 
 Official website

 
Sports leagues established in 2009
Twenty20 cricket leagues
Sport in Bangalore
Cricket leagues in India
Sport in Karnataka
Professional sports leagues in India
Cricket in Karnataka
2009 establishments in Karnataka